The End Machine is an American supergroup consisting of guitar player George Lynch (Lynch Mob, KXM, ex-Dokken), bass player Jeff Pilson (Foreigner, ex-Dokken, ex-Dio, ex-McAuley Schenker Group), drummer Mick Brown (ex-Dokken, ex-Lynch Mob, ex-Ted Nugent) and singer Robert Mason (Warrant, ex-Lynch Mob). According to a 2021 interview with guitarist George Lynch, the band is an intentional return to the classic Dokken sound.

Previously announced as Superstroke, the band released their debut self-titled album on March 22, 2019 produced by Jeff Pilson via Italia record label Frontiers.

During 2019 tour the Evanescence drummer Will Hunt temporarily replaced Mick Brown who then gave way permanently to his younger brother Steve who took part in the recordings of the new album entitled Phase2 which was released on April 9, 2021, also produced by Jeff Pilson via Frontiers.

On December 16 2022, George Lynch announced The End Machine were working on the third album with a new singer, Girish Pradhan (FIRSTBORNE, Girish And The Chronicles). "We loved Robert Mason [who sang on the first two THE END MACHINE albums], and he's an incredible singer, but we felt it was time for a little bit of a change.", said Lynch.

Discography 
 2019 – The End Machine
 2021 – Phase2

Members 

Current members
George Lynch – guitar 
Jeff Pilson – bass, producing 
Girish Pradhan – vocals 
Steve Brown – drums, percussion 

Past members
Robert Mason – vocals 
Mick Brown – drums 

Touring members
Will Hunt – drums

References 

American heavy metal musical groups
Musical groups established in 2019
Frontiers Records artists
2019 establishments in the United States